Zubar is a surname. Notable people with the surname include:

Ronald Zubar (born 1985), French footballer
Stéphane Zubar (born 1986), French footballer, brother of Ronald
Svyatoslav Zubar (born 1993), Ukrainian footballer